The Tagagawik River is a stream,  long, in the northwestern part of the U.S. state of Alaska.

Its Inuit name was first reported in 1886 by U.S. Navy Lieutenant Stoney, which he spelled as "Tag-gag-a-wik". The name appeared on a map in 1900.

See also
List of rivers of Alaska

References

Rivers of Alaska
Rivers of Northwest Arctic Borough, Alaska
Rivers of Yukon–Koyukuk Census Area, Alaska
Rivers of Unorganized Borough, Alaska